Cured is an American documentary film, directed by Bennett Singer and Patrick Sammon and released in 2020. The film depicts the inner workings of the campaign that led to homosexuality being delisted from the Diagnostic and Statistical Manual of Mental Disorders in 1973.

Release
The film premiered on August 24, 2020 at Outfest. With the festival presented virtually due to the COVID-19 pandemic, it was subsequently named to the festival's "Encore Week", which presented followup rescreenings of selected films from the festival's official lineup. In November, it won the Audience Award for Best Documentary Feature at NewFest.

Reception

Accolades

References

External links
 
 Cured at Independent Lens by PBS

2020 films
2020 documentary films
2020 LGBT-related films
American documentary films
American LGBT-related films
Documentary films about LGBT topics
Films about psychiatry
Films about conversion therapy
2020s English-language films
2020s American films